Blessing Offor is a Nigerian-born American Christian pop and gospel singer, songwriter, and composer.

Early life and career 
He and his family migrated to Connecticut at 6 years old with his siblings and uncle and was diagnosed with glaucoma in one eye. When he was 10 he went completely blind due to an accident. He started composing music on piano and learned to play songs from Stevie Wonder and Sam Cook, his musical influences. He carried on with his career as a gospel musician despite his situation. He moved Nashville to pursue music more.

He then played at bars on his young adult years before competing on The Voice during Season 7, and performed “Just The Two of Us”, but was eliminated.

He regularly preforms at the Kennedy Center to help spread awareness about artists with disabilities. He then released “Brighter Days” along with an album named after it in 2022. The song reached 17 on the Billboard Top 20 at the time.

In the year 2023, he created a single with fellow Christian singer, TobyMac called “The Goodness”, and also released a solo single called “My Tribe” which peaked at number 2 on Billboard Christian AirPlay for seven weeks. "My Tribe" pays tribute to his sister, Mercy, who passed away December 29, 2022. The song also pays tribute to his home country, Nigeria. 

Later that year, his song "Believe" reached number 23, on Christian Top 40.

References 

American gospel singers
Nigerian gospel singers
Nigerian male singers
American male singers
Living people
Musicians from Nashville, Tennessee
Performers of Christian music
Blind singers